Tyrone Tormin (born 29 June 2001) is a French professional footballer who plays as a winger for Niort in the French Ligue 2.

Club career
On 6 April 2019, Tormin signed his first professional contract with Saint-Étienne. Tormin made his professional debut with Saint-Étienne in a 3-0 Ligue 1 loss to on 26 September 2020.

On 31 August 2021, he signed a three-year contract with Niort.

Personal life
Tormin is the brother of the footballer Guévin Tormin.

Career statistics

References

External links
 
 Ligue 1 Profile
 

2001 births
Living people
Sportspeople from Clichy, Hauts-de-Seine
French footballers
France youth international footballers
French people of Guadeloupean descent
Association football wingers
AS Saint-Étienne players
Chamois Niortais F.C. players
Ligue 1 players
Ligue 2 players
Championnat National 2 players
Championnat National 3 players
Footballers from Hauts-de-Seine